Mac Aodhagáin (English: Egan or Keegan), is an Irish Gaelic clan of Brehons who were hereditary lawyers - firstly to the Ó Conchobhair Kings of Connacht, and later to the Burkes of Clanricarde.

The earliest surviving Irish law manuscript, In Senchas Már, was written prior to 1350 at a school (patronised by the Mac Aodhagáin) at Duniry, near Loughrea. Other branches of the clann maintained schools at Park, outside Tuam, and at Ballymacegan in Co. Tipperary. The work known as Leabhar Breac was produced by one of their students, while Dubhaltach MacFhirbhisigh may have studied at Ballymacegan under Flann Mac Aodhagáin up to the year 1643.

Naming conventions

The surname has been Anglicised in a variety of ways, including as Mac Egan, Egan, Eagan, Keegan, McKeegan, or  Keigan, McKiegan, and McKagan.

Annalistic references
 AC1225.30 Tadc O Finnachta, an officer of Aed son of Ruaidri [O Conchobair] was killed by Mac Aedacan's men on a plundering raid in this same war.
 AC1273.4 Jordan d'Exeter raided the Corann, and a few of the Connacht princes came up with his party; but they were incited to an unwise move by an evil(?) man, so that Domnall son of Donnchad son of Magnus [O Conchobair] and Magnus son of Art and Oirechtach Mac Aedacain and Aed O Birn and many others were killed.
 M1474.21 Gilla-Finn Mac Egan, Ollav to O'Conor Faly ... died. Gilla Fionn Mac Aodhagáin, Ollamh Ó Conchubhair Failghe
 M1486.29 Teige Mac Egan, Ollav of Annaly, was slain in an abominable manner by the descendants of Irial O'Farrell. Teige Mac Aodhagáin
 M1487.24 John, the son of Conor Mac Egan, Ollav of Clanrickard, and Hugh, the son of Brian, son of Farrel Roe O'Higgin, died. Sean mac Conchubhair Mac Aodhagáin
 M1529.8 Cosnamhach, the son of Farrell, son of Donough Duv Mac Egan, the most distinguished adept in the Fenechas, poetry, and lay Brehonship, in all the Irish territories, died, and was interred at Elphin. An Cosnamhach Mac Aodhagáin
 M1529.9 Mac Egan of Ormond (Donnell, the son of Hugh, son of Donnell), head of the learned of Leath-Mhogha in Feneachus and poetry, died. Domhnall mac Aedh Mac Aodhagáin

Family trees from Geinealaigh Clainne Aodhagáin, below
    Muirchertach Mac Aodhagáin
    |
    |___
    |                       |                      |
    |                       |                      |
    Saérbrethach       Donnchad Mór                Mael Ísu
    |                       |                      |
    |                       |                      |
  Mac Aodhagáin      Mac Aodhagáin of Connacht,    Magnus
  of Munster          Westmeath and Leinster       |
                                                   |
                                                   Aed
                                                   |
                                                   |
                                                   Domnall
                                                   |
                                                   |
                                                   Aed Gilla Ísa

Mac Aodhagáin of Munster
    Muirchertach Mac Aodhagáin
    |
    |___
    |                       |                      |
    |                       |                      |
    Saérbrethach       Donnchad Mór                Mael Ísu
    |
    |_
    |                                          |                 |
    |                                          |                 |
    Gilla na Naem                              Fland             Fingin
    |                                          |                 |
    |__                        |                 |
    |                 |                    Saérbrethach          Fingin
    |                 |                        |                 |
    Saérbrethach      Dond Sléibhe             |                 |
    |                 |                  Mael Isu Ruadh,         Saerdalach
    |                 |                    d. 1317.
    Fland             Gilla na Naem
    |                 |
    |                 |_
    Tomás             |              |        |
    |                 |              |        |
    |                 Conchobar   Cairbre   Fiachra
    Tomás Aimréid     |
    |                 |___
    |                 |                           |                 |                        |
    Conchobar         |                           |                 |                        |
    |                 Gilla na Naem, d. 1399.     Aed, d. 1359.     Tadcc                Donall, d. 1413.
    |                 |                                                                      |
    Cairbre           |__                        |
                      |                        |       |           |                     Conchobar
                      |                        |       |           |                         |
                      Gilla na Naem, d. 1443.  Aed   Domnall    Donnchad        _|_
                      |                                |                        |            |                           |
     _|          __|        |            |                           |
     |                |          |    |       |          |             |        Sean       Tadcc                    Baethgalach
     |                |          |    |       |          |             |        |                                        |
     Gilla na Naem    Cairbre    Aed  Fergal  Conchobar  Muirchertach  Eogan    |                                        |_
     |                |          |                                              |                                        |        |
     |                |          |                   ___|___                 |        |
     Domnall          Donnchad   Domnall, d. 1529.   |           |              |          |          |                  Domnall  Tacc,
     |               & William                       |           |              |          |          |                  |        Aed Clerech,
     |                                               Brian   An Cosnamach   Conchobar  Muircheartach  Gilla na Naem      |        William.
     An Cosnamaid                                                                                                        |
     |                                                                                                         __|
     |                                                                                                         |         |
     Cairbre                                                                                                   |         |
     |                                                                                                         Cairbre  Baethgalach
     |_
     |          |          |          |
     |          |          |          |
     William  Flann    Donnchad   Cairbre Óge
     |       d. 1643   d. 1602     d. 1601
     |
     Seán, fl. 1644.

Mac Aodhagáin of Lower Connacht
   Muirchertach Mac Aodhagáin
    |
    |___
    |                       |                      |
    |                       |                      |
    Saérbrethach       Donnchad Mór                Mael Ísu
    |                       |                      |
    |                       |                      |
  Mac Aodhagáin             |                      Magnus
  of Munster                |
                            |
    |_
    |                       |        |
    |                       |        |
    Baethgalach          Diarmait    Donnchad Claen
    |                     issue        issue

Mac Aodhagáin of Cineil Fiachrach and Offaly
   Muirchertach Mac Aodhagáin
    |
    |___
    |                       |                      |
    |                       |                      |
    Saérbrethach       Donnchad Mór                Mael Ísu
    |                       |                      |
    |                       |                      |
  Mac Aodhagáin             |                      Magnus
  of Munster                |
                            |
    |_
    |                       |        |
    |                       |        |
    Baethgalach          Diarmait    Donnchad Claen
    |                     issue        issue

Mac Aodhagáin Ollamhs of Connacht
    Muirchertach Mac Aodhagáin
    |
    |___
    |                       |                      |
    |                       |                      |
    Saérbrethach       Donnchad Mór                Mael Ísu
    |                       |                      |
    |                       |                      |
  Mac Aodhagáin             |                      Magnus
  of Munster                |
                            |
    |__
    |                       |             |
    |                       |             |
    Baethgalach          Diarmait         Donnchad Claen
  (see Lower Connacht)      |
                            |_
                            |                                                                               |
                            |                                                                               |
                       Sairbrethach                                                                         In Cosnamaid
                            |                                                                               |
                            |                                                                               |
                      Mael Isa Dond, d. 1330.                                                               Crimthann
                            |                                                                               |
     ___|               |
     |                                  |         |                      |      |          |                Aed
     |                                  |         |                      |      |          |
     Sairbrethach Caech, d. 1354.     Roiberd     Muirchertach Buidhe    Sean   Donnchad   Tomas Tuathach
     |                                  |         |
     |_         |         |
     |                        |       Eogan       |                   |
     |                        |                   |                   |
     Solam               Saerdalach              Tomaltach Carrach    Baethgalach
     |                        |                                       |
     |     ___|                                       |
     |     |                  |                                       Eogan
     |     |                  |                                       |
     |     Donnchad Dub       Rioberd                                 |
     |     |                  |                                       Eogan
     |     |                  |
     |     |                  |                   |           |
     |     |                  |                   |           |
     |     |                  Brian, d. 1473.     Sean        Toinn Buidhe
     |     |                  |                   |           |
     |     |                  |                   |           |
     |     |                  Aed,                Roiberd     Solam Buidhe
     |     |                  Magnus.
     |     |__
     |     |                      |                  |                  |        |      |              |                |      |
     |     |                      |                  |                  |        |      |              |                |      |
     |     Brian Carrach        Fergal              Aed            Saerdalach    Eogan  Gilla na Naem  Domnall Clerech  Tadcc  Diarmait Buidhe
     |     |                      |                  |                  |
     |     |                      |                  |                  |
     |     Sean,               Conchobar,          Uilliam,           Tadcc,
     |     Uilliam,            Saerdalach,         Tadcc,             Sean.
     |     Saerdalach,       Muirchertach C.,      Mael-Ruin,
     |     Cormac G.,      An Cosnamaid, d. 1529.  Donnchad,
     |     Conchobar.                              Cairbre.
     |        na-Tet
     |     an brathair
     |
     |                                                                           |
     |                                                                           |
     Airechtach                                                                  Mael Isu
     |                                                                           |
     |                                                                           |
     Gilla na Naem, d. 1447.                                                     |                  |
     |                                                                           |                  |
     |           Saerbrethach    An Cosnamaid Caech
     |                  |              |               |            |            |                  |
     |                  |              |               |            |            |                  |
     Tadcc, d.1487.  An Cosnmaid   Baethgalach   Gilla na Naem Oc   Fergal       Conchobar,         Caibre,
                                                                                 & Aed.             William,
                                                                                                    & Tadcc.

Mac Aodhagáin of Breifine and Teathba
    Muirchertach Mac Aodhagáin
    |
    |___
    |                       |                      |
    |                       |                      |
    Saérbrethach       Donnchad Mór                Mael Ísu
    |                       |                      |
    |                       |                      |
  Mac Aodhagáin             |                      Magnus
  of Munster                |
                            |
    |_
    |                       |        |
    |                       |        |
    Baethgalach          Diarmait    Donnchad Claen
    of Lower Connacht    issue       |
    _|
    |                                |
    |                                |
    Luccas Mael                      Simon (see Mac Aodhagáin of Clanricarde)
    |
    |___
    |                                              |
    |                                              |
    Tadcc Bacach                                   Brian
    |                                              |
    |___               |_
    |          |         |        |                |                                            |
    |          |         |        |                |                                            |
    Brian,     Sean,     Cormac   Roiberd          Magnus                                     Solam
   d. 1390.   d. 1390.                             |                                            |
    ___|                                            |
    |            |                 |                                                          Maine
    |            |                 |
    Fergal     Cormac              Sean Sagart
    |            |                 |
    |     ___|             |
    |     |          |             Muirchertach, d. 1409.
    |     |          |
    |     Cairbre    Cathal Ruad
    |
    |
    |_
    |      |       |                 |          |
    |      |       |                 |          |
    Eogan  Magnus  Donnchad Clerech  Feidlimid  Emann

Mac Aodhagáin of Clanricarde
   Muirchertach Mac Aodhagáin
    |
    |___
    |                       |                      |
    |                       |                      |
    Saérbrethach       Donnchad Mór                Mael Ísu
    |                       |                      |
    |                       |                      |
  Mac Aodhagáin             |                      Magnus
  of Munster                |
                            |
    |_
    |                       |        |
    |                       |        |
    Baethgalach          Diarmait    Donnchad Claen
    of Lower Connacht    issue       |
    _|
    |                                |
    |                                |
    Simon                      Luccas Mael
    |
    |
    |                                                                  |                                                |
    |                                                                  |                                                |
    Sairbrethach                                                       Mael Isa                                    Saerdalach
    |                                                                  |
    |_                 |___
    |                                  |             |                 |        |                     |
    |                                  |             |                 |        |                     |
    Fland                              Solam     In Decanach           Aed    Raigne                  Donnchad
    |                                  |             |                 |        |                     |
    |           ___|             |                 |        |         |
    |           |             |        |         Diarmait            Fland      |           |         Raigne
    |           |             |        |                                        |           |         |
    |           Diarmait   William    Tadcc                                     Aed     Tomaltach     |
    |           |             |                                                             |         Domnall
    |           |             |                                                             |
    |           Diarmait   Donnchad                                                   Gilla na Naem
    |           |                                                                           |
    |           |                                                                           |
    |           Eogan                                                                 An Cosnamaid
    |           |
    |           |
    |           Conchobar
    Finguine
    |
    |
    Conchobar Ruad, d. 1438.
    |
    |_
    |              |       |         |       |               |      |
    |              |       |         |       |               |      |
    Domnall Glas   Tadcc   William   Eogan   Gilla na Naem   Aed    Sean, d. 1487.
    |
    |
    Domnall Oc
    |
    |
    Tadcc
    |
    |
    Tadcc Oc
    |
    |
    Baethgalach

List of people

Egan
 Boetius Egan (archbishop of Tuam) (1734–1798), Roman Catholic prelate
 Boetius Egan (bishop of Elphin) (died 1650), Roman Catholic prelate
 Chandler Egan, golfer
 Chris Egan (disambiguation), several people
 Daniel Egan, former mayor of Sydney, Australia
 Dennis Egan (born 1947), Alaska politician
 Eddie Eagan (1897–1967), only athlete to win gold medals in both Summer (boxing) and Winter (4-man bobsled) Olympics
 Eddie Egan (1930–1995), New York police detective depicted in The French Connection
 Edward Egan, Roman Catholic Cardinal
 Felim Egan, painter
 George W. Egan, South Dakota politician
 Gerard Egan, psychologist
 Greg Egan, science fiction author
 James Egan (disambiguation), several people called James or Jim
Jane Egan, athlete, lawyer
 Jennifer Egan, author
 Joe Egan (disambiguation), several people
 John Egan (disambiguation), several people
 Kenny Egan, boxer
 Johnny Egan (basketball), basketball player and coach
 Joseph F. Egan (c.1917–1964), New York politician
 Joseph V. Egan, New Jersey politician
 Kian Egan, singer, part of the band Westlife
 Kieran Egan (educationist), English educator
 Kieran Egan (politician), Irish politician
 Mark Egan, jazz musician
 Matthew Egan, Australian Rules footballer
 Maureen Egan, American writer and director of music videos and films
 Maurice Francis Egan, American writer and diplomat
 Michael Egan (disambiguation), several people
 Philip Egan (born 1955), Bishop of Portsmouth
 Pierce Egan, journalist
 Richard Egan (disambiguation), several people
 Roma Egan, ballet dancer
 Sam Egan, journalist and producer
 Seamus Egan, musician
 Sean Egan, computer software developer
 Susan Egan, American actress
 Ted Egan, Australian folk musician and Administrator of the Northern Territory
 Thomas Egan (disambiguation), several people
 Timothy Egan, writer
 Walter Egan (born 1948), American musician
 Walter Egan (golfer), golfer
 William Egan (disambiguation), several people

Keegan

 Andrew Keegan (born 1979), American actor
 Betty Ann Keegan (1920–1974), American politician
 Bob Keegan (1920–2001), American baseballer
 Chad Keegan (born 1979), South African cricketer
 Claire Keegan (born 1968), Irish writer
 Colm Keegan, (born 1989), Singer in Celtic Thunder
 Ged Keegan (born 1955), English footballer
 Jake Keegan (born 1991), American soccer player
 Jimmy Keegan (born 1969), American musician 
 Sir John Keegan (1934–2012), English military historian and author
 John C. Keegan (born 1952), American judge, retired military officer, and Arizona politician
 Kevin Keegan (born 1951), English football manager and former player
 Lisa Graham Keegan, American education reform advocate, Arizona politician and political activist 
 Marina Keegan (1989–2012), American author
 Michelle Keegan (born 1987), British actress
 Paul Keegan (disambiguation), multiple people, including:
Paul Keegan (born 1972), Irish footballer 
Paul Keegan (born 1984), Irish footballer 
 Rose Keegan (born 1965), British actress
 Rupert Keegan (born 1955), English racing driver
 Scarlett Keegan (born 1984), American model and actress
 Victor Keegan (born 1940), British journalist and author focusing on economics and technology issues

See also
 Redwood Castle
 Aed mac Conchbair Mac Aodhagáin, (1330–1359), bard
 Baothghalach Mór Mac Aodhagáin (1550–1600), poet
 Gilla na Naemh Mac Aodhagáin (d. 1399), professor of judiciary

References

 Geinealaigh Clainne Aodhagáin A.D. 1400-1500 Ollamhain I Bhféineachus Is I Bhfilidheacht, Caitilín Ní Maol Chróin (Kathleen Mulchrone),Measgra i gcuimhne Mhichíl Uí Chléirigh. Miscellany of historical and linguistic studies in honour of Brother Michael Ó Cléirigh, chief of the Four Masters, 1643-1943, ed. by Father Sylvester O'Brien, Assisi Press, Dublin, 1944, pp. 132–139.

External links
Egan family pedigree at Library Ireland
Clann Mac Aodhagáin (USA/Canada) at Clan Egan
Clann Mac Aodhagáin (Australia & New Zealand) at Egan Family
Clann Mac Aodhagáin Britain at Clan Keegan

Lordship of Ireland
Irish writers
Irish families
Surnames
Surnames of Irish origin
Irish Brehon families
Mac Aodhagain
Families of Irish ancestry
Early Modern Ireland